Mary Winifred Gloria Hunniford, OBE (born 10 April 1940) is a Northern Irish television and radio presenter, broadcaster and singer. She is known for presenting programmes on the BBC and ITV, such as Rip Off Britain, and her regular appearances as a panellist on Loose Women. She has been a regular reporter on This Morning and The One Show. She also had a singing career between the 1960s and 1980s.

Early life
Gloria Hunniford was born in Portadown, County Armagh, Northern Ireland, into a Protestant family; her father, a magician, was a member of the Orange Order. She had an older sister, Lena and a younger brother, Charles. In her teens, she spent some time in Kingston, Ontario, Canada, a period she considers very important in broadening her outlook.

Career

Television
After starting off as a singer, Hunniford worked as a  production assistant for UTV in Belfast then as a local radio broadcaster for the BBC; it was at UTV that she met her first husband Don Keating, a Catholic. In the 1970s and 1980s, she was the presenter of Good Evening Ulster and on the ITV Network Sunday Sunday and We Love TV. She has also appeared on many programmes over the years including Lily Savage's Blankety Blank and on Call My Bluff. She also appeared on Blankety Blank with Bradley Walsh in 2021.

Hunniford recorded two albums that were released in the 1970s. In 1985, she sang at the Royal Variety Performance. As part of the film musicals theme, she sang "Secret Love" from Calamity Jane, as originally performed by Doris Day.

In 1995 Hunniford became one of the many presenters on the long-running BBC chat show series Pebble Mill At One where she also presented a special one off episode interviewing Doris Day. 

From 1998 to 2003, Hunniford presented Open House with Gloria Hunniford for Channel 5. In August 2010, she appeared as a panellist/presenter on the ITV daytime programme 3@Three.

Since 2009, Hunniford has co-presented Rip Off Britain, a consumer complaints programme on BBC One with Angela Rippon and, for the first two series, Jennie Bond, and then, for the third series, with Julia Somerville replacing Bond. Together, the trio of Hunniford, Rippon and Somerville also presented Charlie's Consumer Angels.

In 2012, Hunniford presented the BBC One documentary series Doorstep Crime 999.

From 8 September 2014, Hunniford became a regular panellist on ITV chat show Loose Women. She was previously a guest panellist in 2003. She has guest anchored the show on 4 occasions between October 2014 and August 2016. 

In 2014, Hunniford presented the first series of BBC One programme Home Away from Home. Gyles Brandreth presented the second series. She has also presented three series of Food: Truth or Scare with Chris Bavin from 2016.

In January 2022, Hunniford appeared on the third series of The Masked Singer as "Snow Leopard". She was second to be unmasked.

Strictly Come Dancing

In 2005, Hunniford appeared in the third series of the BBC's Strictly Come Dancing, dancing with Darren Bennett and was eliminated from the competition on the third week.

Guest appearances
Hunniford has appeared on numerous programmes including Gloria Live, Wogan, Holiday, Songs of Praise, That's Showbusiness, Kilroy and Sunday, Sunday.

In 2003, Hunniford appeared in two episodes of Loose Women as a guest panellist.

In 2008, Hunniford was a regular panellist on Through the Keyhole and was a celebrity homeowner on an episode in 2018. On 27 September 2013, Hunniford appeared on an episode of Piers Morgan's Life Stories. On 28 January 2014, Hunniford took part in an episode of Celebrity Who Wants to Be a Millionaire? She appeared in an episode of Harry Hill's Alien Fun Capsule in 2017.

Radio
Hunniford had her own daily radio show on BBC Radio 2, starting with the lunchtime show in January 1982 before moving to an afternoon slot between 2.00pm and 3.30pm in January 1984, where she remained for 11 years until April 1995, when she was replaced by Debbie Thrower. Hunniford also hosted Sounding Brass, a music phone-in request programme with a live brass band, devised by radio producer Owen Spencer-Thomas.

Other work
Hunniford has made a health and exercise video called Fit for Life.  Hunniford has also appeared on the UK music video of  The Muppets' cover version of Fine Young Cannibals song She Drives Me Crazy. She also has written an Irish recipe book with her sister Lena, Gloria Hunniford's Family Cookbook.

Charity involvements
Hunniford is a Patron of Hope for Tomorrow, a UK charity providing Mobile Cancer Care Units (MCCUs).

Personal life
Hunniford was married to Don Keating from 1970 to 1992. They had a daughter, Caron Keating, and two sons, Paul and Michael. In September 1998, she married hairdresser Stephen Way in Tunbridge Wells, Kent. She lives in Sevenoaks, Kent.

Hunniford became an advocate of chakra meditations after meeting a swami backstage on Loose Women. While not converting to esoteric Hinduism fully she has supported Tantra ever since.

In 2022, Hunniford suffered a fall at home, breaking a bone under her eye. As a result she did not take part in the Platinum Jubilee celebrations.

Caron Keating
Hunniford's daughter Caron Keating (5 October 1962 – 13 April 2004) died of breast cancer in Kent. Hunniford set up a cancer charity in her daughter's name; the Caron Keating Foundation. 

Hunniford was appointed Officer of the Order of the British Empire (OBE) in the 2017 Birthday Honours for services to cancer charities.

Political views
On The Alan Titchmarsh Show on 6 May 2011, Hunniford revealed her support for David Cameron's Conservative-led coalition government, describing herself as "a bit of a David Cameron fan", although she criticised the government's decision to continue giving aid to Pakistan when it was making cuts in the UK.

In August 2014, Hunniford was one of 200 public figures who were signatories to a letter to The Guardian opposing Scottish independence in the run-up to September's referendum on that issue.

Filmography
Television

Discography

Albums
That's How I Spell I.R.E.L.A.N.D. (1970), Outlet
Good Evening...Gloria Hunniford (1979), Release
A Taste of Hunni (1982), Ritz (compilation)

Singles
"Are You Ready for Love" (1969), Metronome
"Give the Children Back Their Childhood (1979), Release
"True Love" (1987), Honey Bee - Foster & Allen with Gloria Hunniford
"Give the Children Back Their Childhood (1988), Ocean
"Pudsey's Picnic" (1989), President - Gloria Hunniford, Adrian Love & Graham Dolby

See also
 List of Strictly Come Dancing contestants

References

External links

British memoirists
British philanthropists
British radio DJs
BBC Radio 2 presenters
People from Portadown
British women radio presenters
Radio personalities from Northern Ireland
Television presenters from Northern Ireland
People educated at Portadown College
1940 births
Living people
UTV (TV channel)
Officers of the Order of the British Empire
Women autobiographers